Eduard Valeriyovych Matveyenko (born 18 January 1998) is a Ukrainian footballer who plays as a defender for Podillya Khmelnytskyi.

Club career
Matveyenko made his professional debut for Bukovyna Chernivtsi in the Ukrainian Second League on 6 April 2019, coming on as a substitute in the 46th minute for Mykola Pavlyuk in the home match against Mynai, which finished as a 0–0 draw.

References

External links
 
 
 
 
 Eduard Matveyenko at UPL.ua
 Eduard Matveyenko at PFL.ua

1998 births
Living people
Sportspeople from Mariupol
Ukrainian footballers
Ukraine youth international footballers
Ukraine student international footballers
Association football defenders
FC Bukovyna Chernivtsi players
FC Podillya Khmelnytskyi players
Ukrainian First League players
Ukrainian Second League players